The Cathedral of St. John the Baptist is a historic Catholic cathedral and parish church located in Paterson, Passaic County, New Jersey, United States. It is the seat of the Roman Catholic Diocese of Paterson. The cathedral was listed on the National Register of Historic Places in 1977.

History
By the middle of the 1820s, there were definite indications that the local Catholic population was expanding. Coupled with the tremendous growth of Paterson industries, there was an insistent demand for skilled millhands and other types of workers. By 1870, the U.S. Census reported that Irish immigrants constituted the dominant foreign-born population in the city. The majority of the Irish, along with other immigrant classes, lived in ramshackle tenement houses within almost walking distance of the great mills. Most conspicuously, the Irish clustered about Grand Street, and this area became known as the "Dublin" section of Paterson. It was there, among the Irish-Catholic immigrants, that Father William N. McNulty began his priestly duties.

Two years after arriving in Paterson to take "charge of the fortunes and spiritual welfare" of the rapidly growing Catholic population, Father McNulty entered into negotiations with the powerful industrial corporation, the Society for Establishing Useful Manufactures ("S.U.M."), and in 1865 purchased from it sixteen lots on the corner of Grand and Main streets thus ensuring the future of a more larger St. John's Church (later Cathedral of St. John the Baptist). The new enterprise seemed to infuse new vigor into the members of the congregation, and the full amount of the purchase money of the real estate ($10,000) was raised in two months. Preparations were made for the construction of the new church, New York architect P. C. Keely was retained in order to develop plans "for an edifice ... unequaled in New Jersey", and on September 10, 1865, the corner-stone was laid.

The church was ready for use in the summer of 1870, and a final tabulation a number of years later revealed that approximately $200,000 had been spent in the course of construction. It was raised to cathedral status when the Diocese of Paterson was established in 1937.

See also
List of Catholic cathedrals in the United States
List of cathedrals in the United States
List of tallest buildings in Paterson

References

External links

Official Cathedral Site
Diocese of Paterson Official Site

Roman Catholic Diocese of Paterson
Roman Catholic churches in New Jersey
Churches on the National Register of Historic Places in New Jersey
Gothic Revival church buildings in New Jersey
Roman Catholic churches completed in 1865
John the Baptist, Paterson
19th-century Roman Catholic church buildings in the United States
Churches in Passaic County, New Jersey
National Register of Historic Places in Passaic County, New Jersey
Buildings and structures in Paterson, New Jersey
New Jersey Register of Historic Places